Events from the year 1704 in Ireland.

Incumbent
Monarch: Anne

Events
 Registration Act, an Act of Parliament of the Parliament of Ireland, one of a series of Penal Laws, requires all existing Roman Catholic priests to register in their local magistrates' court by July 20, to pay two £50 surety bonds for good behavior, and to stay in the county where they registered, with a financial inducement to convert to the Church of Ireland.
 A House of Industry opens in Dublin to accommodate the destitute.
 October 26 – Richard Levinge, member of the Irish House of Commons, is created 1st Levinge Baronet, of High Park in the County of Westmeath.
 Thomas Taylor, member of the Irish House of Commons, is created 1st Taylor Baronet, of Kells in the County of Meath.

Arts and literature
 George Farquhar co-writes the play The Stage Coach.
 Jonathan Swift publishes his first major satires, A Tale of a Tub and The Battle of the Books, in London.

Births
William Handcock, politician (d. 1741)

Deaths
January 1 – Dominic Burke Roman Catholic Bishop of Elphin.
February 20 – Thomas FitzWilliam, 4th Viscount FitzWilliam, statesman (b. c.1640)
c. February – Sir Thomas Butler, 3rd Baronet, politician.
August – Francis Taaffe, 3rd Earl of Carlingford, courtier and soldier.
November – Henry Nugent, soldier.

References

 
Years of the 18th century in Ireland
Ireland
1700s in Ireland